Coclaurine is a nicotinic acetylcholine receptor antagonist which has been isolated from a variety of plant sources including Nelumbo nucifera, Sarcopetalum harveyanum, Ocotea duckei, and others.  It belongs to the class of tetrahydroisoquinoline alkaloids.  Dimerization of coclaurine leads to the biscoclaurine alkaloids such as cepharanthine.

References

Nicotinic antagonists
Benzylisoquinoline alkaloids
Phenols